Minuscule 1281 (in the Gregory-Aland numbering), ε1019 (von Soden), is a Greek minuscule manuscript of the New Testament written on parchment. Palaeographically it has been assigned to the 10th century. The manuscript has no complex contents. Scrivener labelled it as 469e.

Description 
The codex contains the text of the four Gospels, on 259 parchment leaves (size ), with some lacunae. It lacks the beginning of Matthew, Mark, Luke, Luke 2:9-22; John 10:125-12:26; 13:4-21:25. The text is written in one column per page, 19 lines per page. It has decorated headpieces.

There is also another division according to the smaller Ammonian Sections, with references to the Eusebian Canons.

Text 
The Greek text of the codex is a representative of the Byzantine text-type with some pre-Byzantine readings. Hermann von Soden classified it to the textual family Iκ, which text was established by Pamphilius in Caesarea. Aland did not place it in any Category.

According to the Claremont Profile Method it represents textual family Kx in Luke 1 and Luke 20. In Luke 10 no profile was made. It belongs to the textual cluster Ω.

History 
Scrivener dated the manuscript to the 11th or 12th century; Gregory dated the manuscript to the 10th century. The manuscript is currently dated by the INTF to the 10th century.

It was added to the list of the New Testament manuscripts by F. H. A. Scrivener (469) and C. R. Gregory (1281). Gregory saw the manuscript in 1886.

It was brought by Alexander Cesnola from Cyprus. It was catalogued in Bernard Quaritch's Catalogue (March 1893).

The manuscript is now housed at the Fitzwilliam Museum (Mc-Clean Collection?) in Cambridge.

See also 

 List of New Testament minuscules
 List of New Testament minuscules (1001–2000)
 Biblical manuscript
 Textual criticism

References

Further reading 

 

Greek New Testament minuscules
10th-century biblical manuscripts
Manuscripts of the Fitzwilliam Museum